Indonesian National Route 11 is a road in the national route system that is located in the Banten and West Java province, and connects Labuhan, Pandeglang Regency, Banten on the western end, and Cianjur, Cianjur Regency, West Java in the eastern end.

Route

Banten
Labuan - Menes - Saketi - Pandeglang - Rangkasbitung - Cigelung

West Java
Jasinga - Leuwiliang - Cigudeg - Ciampea - Dramaga - Bogor - Ciawi - Gadog - Cipayung - Cisarua - Puncak - Ciloto - Cipanas - Pacet - Cugenang - Cianjur

External Links
 http://hubdat.dephub.go.id/keputusan-dirjen/tahun-2007/561-keputusan-dirjen-no-sk-930aj/download 
 http://hubdat.dephub.go.id/keputusan-dirjen/tahun-2008/562-peraturan-dirjen-sk-1207aj/download 

Indonesian National Routes
Transport in West Java
Transport in Banten